The Long Creek School is a historic building in Lafayette, Tennessee. It was built circa 1885 on land that belonged to the Johnson family. It was moved 25 feet west to its current location circa 1923. It closed down in 1950, and later served as a community meeting place. It has been listed on the National Register of Historic Places since February 22, 1993.

References

1885 establishments in Tennessee
School buildings completed in 1885
Educational institutions disestablished in 1950
Defunct schools in Tennessee
National Register of Historic Places in Macon County, Tennessee
Relocated buildings and structures in Tennessee